Wa Kyun is an island in the Andaman Sea, right off the coast of Mon State, in the southern area of Burma. 

Geography
Wa Kyun is in the center of a chain of small coastal islands that lie off the mouth of the Ye River.

Nearby islands
There are three smaller islands located on the same shoal as Wa Kyun:
Hngetpiaw Kyun , 0.3 km in length narrow and thickly wooded islet, 46 m high, located 1.6 km to the SW of Wa Kyun 
Nat Kyun , 1.15 km long island, 135 m high, located 2 km to the south of Wa Kyun 
Kyettaik Kyun , very small 24 m high islet, 0.5 km in diameter, located 2 km to the southeast of Nat Kyun

See also
List of islands of Burma

References 

Mon State
Islands of Myanmar